Gallastichus mutuus is a species of Afrotropical chalcid wasp in a monotypic genus from the family Eulophidae.

References

Eulophidae